Wayne Berry (August 2, 1932 – October 5, 2018) was an American football halfback. He played for the New York Giants in 1954.

He died on October 5, 2018, in Eagle, Idaho at age 86.

References

1932 births
2018 deaths
American football halfbacks
Washington State Cougars football players
New York Giants players
People from La Grande, Oregon